De la Chapelle is a French independent car builder. Founded in the early 1970s by Xavier de la Chapelle, a former Venturi director, the brand started as a Bugatti replica maker.

The De la Chapelle family have an historic automobile legacy with the Stimula marque.

In 1996 they created the Roadster, their second own creation.

They also make mini real-cars for children.

The Replicas are powered by BMW (Straight-6), the Roadster by Peugeot (Straight-4/V6) and the concept car by Mercedes (V8) or Jaguar (V12).

Current models

Replicas

 DLC type 55
 DLC Tourer
 DLC Grand-Prix
 DLC Atalante

Proper models

 DLC Parcours 
 DLC Roadster

Junior replica models
 BMW 328
 Bugatti Type 55
 Ferrari F 330 P2

External links

Official Website
Rochetaillée Museum

Sports car manufacturers
Car manufacturers of France
Retro-style automobiles
French brands